Aprasia aurita, also called the mallee worm-lizard or eared worm-lizard, is a species of lizard in the Pygopodidae family endemic to Australia; and listed on Schedule 1 under the Commonwealth's Endangered Species Protection Act. It is also listed as "threatened" on Schedule 2 under the Victorian Flora and Fauna Guarantee Act. A. aurita was formerly found in the Woomelang and Ouyen areas of north-western Victoria. It has also been found in Cobbler Creek Recreation Park in South Australia and Mambray Creek Reserve. It inhabits tall shrubland and open heath, primarily mallee and other vegetation that has not been burnt for at least 40 years, Shelters under rotting logs, leaf litter and mallee root.

References

aurita
Pygopodids of Australia
Endemic fauna of Australia
Critically endangered fauna of Australia
Reptiles described in 1974
Taxa named by Arnold G. Kluge
Taxonomy articles created by Polbot